Apostema is a genus of moths of the family Noctuidae. The genus was described by Warren in 1913.

Species
Apostema citrina Hreblay & Ronkay, 1998 Nepal
Apostema distigmata (Hampson, 1906) Punjab

References

Cuculliinae